On 9 August 2011, Avis-Amur Flight 9209, an Antonov An-12 cargo aircraft of Avis Amur crashed during a domestic flight from Magadan to Keperveyem, Russia, killing all 11 people on board. An engine fire was reported en route and the aircraft crashed while attempting to return to Magadan.

Accident

The aircraft took off from Sokol Airport in Magadan for Keperveyem Airport, carrying nine crew, two passengers, and 17.58 tonnes of cargo.

The aircraft turned around in an attempt to land back at Magadan, but shortly after disappeared from radar. Fog in the area hampered the search for the aircraft, which crashed in a forest.

Aircraft
The accident aircraft was a turboprop Antonov An-12AP with registration RA-11125, c/n 3341006. It had first flown in 1963 and at the time of the accident was the oldest Russian registered aircraft flying in commercial service.

Investigation
The Interstate Aviation Committee of the Commonwealth of Independent States opened an investigation into the accident. As a result of the accident, the operation of the Antonov An-12 within Russia was banned until a risk assessment programme had been completed.

References

External links
 "Ан-12 RA-11125." Interstate Aviation Committee  (Archive)
 Final report Окончательный отчет Ан-12АП RА-11125 (Archive) 

Aviation accidents and incidents in 2011
Aviation accidents and incidents in Russia
2011 disasters in Russia
Accidents and incidents involving the Antonov An-12
Airliner accidents and incidents caused by in-flight fires
August 2011 events in Russia
Airliner accidents and incidents caused by engine failure